Euphaedra brevis is a butterfly in the family Nymphalidae. It is found in Cameroon and from Equatorial Guinea to the Democratic Republic of the Congo.

References

Butterflies described in 1975
brevis